Intracranial hemorrhage (ICH), also known as intracranial bleed, is bleeding within the skull. Subtypes are intracerebral bleeds (intraventricular bleeds and intraparenchymal bleeds), subarachnoid bleeds, epidural bleeds, and subdural bleeds. More often than not it ends in a lethal outcome.

Intracerebral bleeding affects 2.5 per 10,000 people each year.

Signs and symptoms
Intracranial hemorrhage is a serious medical emergency because the buildup of blood within the skull can lead to increases in intracranial pressure, which can crush delicate brain tissue or limit its blood supply.  Severe increases in intracranial pressure (ICP) can cause brain herniation, in which parts of the brain are squeezed past structures in the skull.

Causes

Trauma is the most common cause of intracranial hemorrhage. It can cause epidural hemorrhage, subdural hemorrhage, and subarachnoid hemorrhage. Other condition such as hemorrhagic parenchymal contusion and cerebral microhemorrhages can also be caused by trauma.

Non-traumatic causes of hemorrhage includes: hypertension, cerebral amyloid angiopathy, hemorrhagic conversion of ischemic infarction, cerebral aneurysms, dural arteriovenous fistulae, cerebral venous sinus thrombosis, cerebral vasculitis and mycotic aneurysm.

More than half of all cases of intracranial hemorrhage are the result of hypertension.

Diagnosis

CT scan (computed tomography) of the brain (without any iodinated contrast), is the initial imaging choice because of its high speed, good accessibility in hospitals, high sensitivity in detecting brain injuries or brain diseases, thus helping to triage patients in emergency department in a timely manner and urgent neurosurgical intervention can be administered. Examples of brain diseases that require urgent intervention are: large volume hemorrhage, brain herniation, and cerebral infarction. Other advantages of CT over MRI scan are ability to detect bony fractures, vascular injury, and cerebrospinal fluid (CSF) leak. It also does not need to screen for MRI safety of implants/foreign body especially for penetrating or blast injuries. Moreover, CT scans have also been used to train deep learning models to automatically perform intracranial hemorrhage detection. Interestingly, deep learning models have been found to reach expert-level performance.

However, MRI has higher sensitivity than CT scan for the detection of epidural hemorrhage, subdural hemorrhage, subarachnoid hemorrhage, nonhemorrhagic cortical contusions, hemorrhagic parenchymal contusions, brainstem injuries, and white matter axonal injuries. If CT scan shows normal findings, but the subject has persistent neurological symptoms, MRI is also indicated. However, MRI safety concerns on metallic foreign bodies, limited availability, longer imaging time, high sensitivity to motion, and higher cost limits the usefulness of MRI.

Swirl sign on CT scan (areas of low densities with surrounding areas of high densities) is indicative of active intracranial bleeding, high chance of death within one month, and poor subject's function in three months if the subject is still alive.

When ICP is increased the heart rate may be decreased.

Traumatic
Types of intracranial hemorrhage are roughly grouped into intra-axial and extra-axial. Intra-axial hemorrhage is bleeding within the brain itself, or cerebral hemorrhage. This category includes intraparenchymal hemorrhage, or bleeding within the brain tissue, and intraventricular hemorrhage, bleeding within the brain's ventricles (particularly of premature infants). Intra-axial hemorrhages are more dangerous and harder to treat than extra-axial bleeds. Hemorrhagic parenchymal contusions and cerebral microhemorrhages are examples of traumatic intra-axial bleeds.

Extra-axial hemorrhage, bleeding that occurs within the skull but outside of the brain tissue, falls into three subtypes: epidural hematoma, subdural hematoma, and subarachnoid hemorrhage.

Hemorrhagic parenchymal contusion

This condition most commonly occurred in those with significant head movement or head impact. It is caused by injuries of small arterial or venous vessels, causing hemorrhage within the brain parenchyma, and give rise to hyperdense lesion on CT scan. MRI is more sensitive than CT scan in detecting such small hemorrhagic contusions, with the use of gradient echo sequence. Contusions are more commonly seen in the brain parenchyma near base of the skull such as inferior frontal lobes and temporal lobes as a result of Coup contrecoup injury. Those with parenchymal contusion would require frequent follow-up imaging because such contusions may grow large enough to become hemorrhage and exerts significant mass effect on the brain.

Cerebral microhemorrhages is a smaller form of hemorrhagic parenchymal contusion and are typically found in white matter. Such microhemorrhages are difficult to be detected on CT scan, but easily detected on gradient echo and susceptibility weighted imaging on MRI scan as hypointense susceptibility blooming. Such microhemorrhages are frequently associated with diffuse axonal injury and located near the grey-white matter junction.

Epidural hemorrhage

Epidural hemorrhage (extradural hemorrhage, EDH) which occur between the dura mater (the outermost meningeal layer) and the skull, is caused by trauma. It does not cross the suture lines of the skull because the superifical dural layer is attached tightly to the skull along the suture lines. Unless rarely, fracture involves the suture lines (more common in children), then epidural hematoma may cross the suture lines. As the blood accumulated in the epidural space is confined within suture lines, accumulation of additional blood will cause bulging in this space, and thus resulting in a typical "biconvex" appearance on CT scans. EDH can be due to arterial or venous rupture depending on the locations. Arterial injuries results in more rapidly growing hematoma when compared to venous injuries. At the pterion region, middle meningeal artery is most commonly affected. When fracture is crossing areas where dural venous sinuses resides, venous hemorrhage can occur such as falx cerebri, tentorium cerebelli, and vertex (where superior sagittal sinus resides). Anterior temporal EDH is usually caused by sphenoparietal sinus. Such EDH is limited and does not require surgery because its extension is confined within sphenosquamosal suture and orbital fissure. In 20 to 50% of epidural hemorrhage cases, there is a lucid interval where a person regained consciousness after being knocked unconscious and then followed by deterioration of consciousness after that.

When the epidural hematoma is large enough, it will cause mass effect on contralateral brain which lead to midline, subfalcine (below the falx cerebri), and trans-tentorial (crossing tentorium cerebelli) herniations. This phenomenon can cause the subject to lose consciousness and eventually death. Therefore, large EDH requires emergent surgical clot evacuation. Embolisation of middle meningeal artery is performed if the hemorrhage is medium or small.

Subdural hemorrhage

Subdural hemorrhage (SDH) results from tearing of the bridging veins in the subdural space between the dura and arachnoid mater. It can cross the suture lines, but not across dural reflections such as falx cerebri or tentorium cerebelli. Therefore, subdural hematoma always limited to one side of the brain. Density of SDH reduces as it progresses from acute to chronic forms. However, areas with low density may not represent chronic SDH entirely as unclotted blood products that are due to active bleed can also give low density appearance on CT scans especially those with coagulopathy. Those with SDH that have same density with brain parenchyma may represent acute bleed such as those with anemia, arachnoid tear, and the mixing of hemorrhage and CSF. SDH usually have high or mixed densities during first two days of trauma, followed by isodensity at 11 days after trauma, and hypodensity after 14 days of trauma. Membranes with granulation tissue can rupture within SDH, and give high density appearance on CT scan. Over a prolonged period of time, calcifications can form. SDH can be treated with burr hole drainage, craniotomy or port system placement for blood clot evacuation, or middle meningeal artery embolisation.

Subdural hematoma maybe less acute than epidural hematoma due to slower blood accumulation, but it still has the potential to cause brain herniation that may require surgical evacuation. Clinical features depend on the site of injury and severity of injury. Patients may have a history of loss of consciousness but they recover and do not relapse. Clinical onset occurs over hours. Complications include focal neurologic deficits depending on the site of hematoma and brain injury, increased intracranial pressure leading to herniation of brain and ischemia due to reduced blood supply and seizures.

Subarachnoid hemorrhage

A subarachnoid hemorrhage (SAH) is bleeding into the subarachnoid space—the area between the arachnoid membrane and the pia mater surrounding the brain. Trauma can also cause SAH when the arteries and veins coursing through the subarachnoid space are ruptured. It is usually located at the cerebral sulci near the vertex of the head and spare the basal cisterns on CT scan. Severe trauma can cause SAH in all parts of the brain. When the SAH volume is large, rarely it can cause cerebral infarction a few days after trauma due to arterial vasospasm. Although CT scan is performed more often than MRI to detect SAH, MRI is more sensitive than CT in this aspect. SAH shows hyperintense signal of Fluid-attenuated inversion recovery (FLAIR) sequence and blooming artifact on susceptibility weighted imaging (SWI).

Computed tomography angiography (CT angiography) or Magnetic resonance angiography (MR angiography) should be done if fracture involves the carotid canal, because in such cases, posttraumatic vasospasm can occur, thus cutting blood supply to the brain. Besides, intracranial hemorrhage that are atypical for trauma should also be investigated further with CT or MR angiography to look for other causes of intracranial bleeds apart from trauma causes. Such atypical patterns includes: isolated SAH in the basal cisterns, isolated large-volume SAH in the Sylvian fissure, and isolated SAH in the anterior interhemispheric fissure. These cases warrants investigations to look for aneurysms that can cause such bleeding.

Non-traumatic

Hypertensive bleed

Intracranial bleed in hypertensive subjects usually occurs at 50 to 60 years of life with 30 to 50% chance of death. Such hemorrhages are typically located in the basal ganglia, cerebellum, or occipital lobes. Other location such as bleed within the cerebral cortex and intracranial bleed in people younger than 50 years should prompt further investigations on other causes of bleed such as brain tumour or cerebral arteriovenous malformation. The bleed can be very small without any significant effect on surrounding brain or large hemorrhage that exerts mass effecct on adjacent brain. Follow up CT scan is recommended. Those with extension of bleed into the ventricular system, expansion of bleeding, or increasing cerebral oedema on CT scan gives poorer prognosis. CT angiography (CTA) of brain can be performed to investigate the source of bleeding. An image during the delayed phase of the CTA may be taken to look for pooling of contrast that signifies active bleeding (known as "Spot sign"). Presence of "Spot sign" signifies poor clinical outcome for the subject.

Cerebral amyloid angiopathy

Cerebral amyloid angiopathy (CAA) is the deposition of Amyloid beta peptide protein within the brain. Accumulation of such peptide proteins within the walls of the arteries can cause weakening of the walls and causes microhemorrhages, SAH within the cerebral sulci or large cerebral intraparenchymal bleed. SAH in CAA can be differentiated from vasculitis by its presentations. SAH in CAA usually occurs in those who age more than 60 years, temporary motor and sensory deficits, and intracranial bleed in white matter adjacent to cerebral cortex. Basal ganglia, posterior fossa, and brainstem are spared. Boston criteria is used to determine the likelihood of a cerebral hemorrhage due to CAA. Definitive diagnosis of CAA is by performing brain biopsy

CT scan may show hyperdense intra-axial hemorrhage in the subcortical region. Diffuse white matter hypodensities in both cerebral hemispheres may represents microangiopathic changes. On MRI these lesions will be presented as blooming artifact on gradient echo and susceptibility weighted imaging.

Hemorrhagic conversion of ischemic infarction

43% of those with infarcted brain tissue will develop hemorrhagic conversion. Risk of hemorrhagic is further increased with recanalisation of veins or arteries. Several types of hemorrhages can occur such as petechial hemorrhages around the infarcted margin (HI1), confluent petechial hemorrhages within the infarcted tissue (HI2), hematoma occupying less than 30% of the infarcted tissue (PH1), hematoma involving greater than 30% of infarcted tissue with small mass effect (PH2), and hematoma involving greater than 30% of the infarcted tissue with significant mass effect. However, only PH2 is clinically significant. Those who has infarction should be monitored frequently with CT brains to access hemorrhagic conversions or worsening vasogenic oedema that may require neurosurgical decompression. Dual energy CT scan maybe useful to differentiate the high densities caused by reperfusion hemorrhage (bleeding after endovascular stroke treatment) and high density due to iodinated contrast administered during cerebral angiography.

Cerebral aneurysm

Besides from head injury, it may occur spontaneously, usually from a ruptured cerebral aneurysm (focal outpouchings with weakened walls on the arteries on the brain surface that are prone to rupture). Symptoms of SAH include a severe headache with a rapid onset (thunderclap headache), vomiting, confusion or a lowered level of consciousness, and sometimes seizures. CT scan has 100% sensitivity of detecting SAH at 6 to 24 hours after symptoms onset. The diagnosis is generally confirmed with a CT scan of the head. If CT scan is normal but SAH is still strongly suspected, lumbar puncture can be done at six to twelfth hours after the onset of headache. This is determine the presence of blood within the cerebrospinal fluid (CSF). Those with SAH will have blood and bilirubin within CSF because of degradation red blood cells. Meanwhile, those who has blood within CSF due to traumatic lumbar puncture will not have bilirubin within CSF.  SAH is generally located within basal cisterns, extends diffusely to all subarachnoid spaces (cerebral sulci) or into the ventricular system, or brain parenchyma. Modified Fisher scale is used to describe the volume and distribution of SAH, just predicting the probability of cerebral artery vasospasm after SAH.

Treatment is by prompt neurosurgery or radiologically guided interventions with medications and other treatments to help prevent recurrence of the bleeding and complications. Since the 1990s, many aneurysms are treated by a minimal invasive procedure known as endovascular coiling, which is carried out by instrumentation through large blood vessels. However, this procedure has higher recurrence rates than the more invasive craniotomy with clipping.

Cerebral ateriovenous malformation

Cerebral ateriovenous malformation (Cerebral AVM) is characterised by abnormal shunting between cerebral arteries and veins without going through capillaries. Instead the blood goes through a collection of small vessels from arteries to veins. These collection of abnormal small vessels is termed as "nidus". This condition happens in 0.1% of the population has a risk of 2 to 4% per year for intracranial bleeding. Once ruptured, it results in intraparenchymal hemorrhage, intraventricular hemorrhage and SAH. Rupture of cerebral AVM often occurs in young people and children. Cerebral AVM can be diagnosed by computed tomography angiography (CTA) brain, magnetic resonance angiography (MRA) brain, or digital subtraction angiography (DSA). DSA is important to determine whether there is nidal or perinidal aneurysm.

Dural arteriovenous fistulae

Dural arteriovenous fistulae (DAVF) is the direct connection between dural or cerebral arteries with dural venous sinuses or cortical veins. It accounts for 10 to 15% of intracranial arteriovenous shunts. DAVF lacks a nidus. Signs and symptoms of DAVF are: headache, tinnitus, neurological deficits involving cranial nerves, and increased intracranial pressure. DAVF once ruptured, will produce intraparenchymal hemorrhage or SAH. Increase in number of vessels near dural venous sinuses as seen on CTA is suggestive of DVAF. 4DCT may increase the sensitivity of detecting DAVF. In MRI scans, susceptibility weighted imaging (SWI) and arterial spin labelling sequences (labelling protons in blood without the use of contrast media to determine blood flow) are useful in evaluating DAVF. The patterns of draining veins from the fistula determines the risk of DAVF rupture. Increased pressure within the dural venous sinuses causes backpressure into the cortical veins, thus making cortical veins more prone to rupture. The risk of hemorrhage is graded by Cognard and Borden grading systems. These grading systems are based upon the DSA.

Cortical venous/cerebral venous sinus thrombosis

Dural venous sinus thrombosis (DVST) and cortical venous thrombosis (CVT) commonly presents with headache, increased intracranial pressure, or seizures. DVST is more common than CVT. DVST are frequently caused by infections in the skull base, dehydration, thrombophilia, meningioma, and other dural tumours. On CT scans, brain parenchymal hemorrhage that does not confined to specific arterial territory along with hyperdense appearance on dural venous sinuses raises the suspicion of DVST. Further evaluation with CT venography, MR venography, and post gadolinium MRI provides accurate diagnosis of venous thrombosis and follow-up after treatment. These studies demonstrate thrombus as filling defect or lack of signal.

Vasculitis/vasculopathy

Those with vasculitis may be presented with headache, behavioural changes, neurological deficits, or intracranial bleeding. Sulcal SAH is the most common form of intracranial bleed caused by vasculitis. On CT scans, sulcal SAH is seen as hyperdensity within the cerebral sulcus, while on MRI, it is seen as hyperintensity on FLAIR sequence, and hypointensity on GRE/SWI sequence. DSA is important in making the diagnosis of vasculitis or vasculopathy.

Mycotic aneurysm

It is arterial outpouchings arise from distal cerebral arteries. These are pseudoaneurysm, caused by thrombus clogging the distal arteries, which results in inflammation and small tears at the site of occlusion. These inflammation and thrombis can caused by infective endocarditis, artificial heart valve or other heart problems. Similar to vasculitis, rupture of mycotic aneurysm also causes SAH in cerebral sulci, mostly located in the vertex. If mycotic aneurysm is located more proximally, it will produce diffuse SAH pattern. CTA or MRA would produce focal outpouching or increase in diameter of the vessel. Meanwhile, GRE/SWI MRI sequence would produce focal hypointensity. Small mycotic aneurysms are difficult to be seen on CT or MRI. Thus, DSA is useful in identifying these lesions.

Management
For those who is already on blood thinners such as aspirin or clopidogrel for prevention of myocardial infarction or stroke, traumatic intracranial hemorrhage should prompt the use of platelet function assays (PFA-100) to assess the effect of these antiplalelet agents. After that, plateletpheresis can be started to increase the aggregation of platelets, thus stopping the intracranial bleed. In those with impaired kidney functions, desmopressin or cryoprecipitate can be used instead.

From limited observational data, it may be relatively safe to restart blood thinners after an ICH as it is asscoated with reduced thromboembolic complications with similar risk of recurrent hemorrhage when compared to those did not start blood thinners after an ICH.

Comparison

References

Further reading 
 Shepherd S. 2004. "Head Trauma." Emedicine.com.
 Vinas FC and Pilitsis J. 2004. "Penetrating Head Trauma." Emedicine.com.
 Julian A. Mattiello, M.D., Ph.D. Michael Munz, M.D. 2001. "Four Types of Acute Post-Traumatic Intracranial Hemorrhage" The New England Journal of Medicine

External links 

Neurotrauma
Stroke